John Robbins House may refer to:

John Robbins House (Rocky Hill, Connecticut), listed on the National Register of Historic Places in Hartford County, Connecticut
John Robbins House (Acton, Massachusetts), listed on the National Register of Historic Places in Middlesex County, Massachusetts

See also
Robbins House (disambiguation)